Yogi Tea is an American brand offering organic herbal, green and black tea blends. The company is privately held and operated in North America by East West Tea Company, LLC and YOGI TEA GmbH for Europe.

History 
Yogi Tea was established in 1984 by Yogi Bhajan, a Kundalini yoga instructor and purported sexual assailant whose students named the tea brand. Bhajan formulated the tea blend's original recipe which is based on Ayurvedic medicine. It consists of cinnamon, cardamom, ginger, cloves and black pepper.

East West Tea Company, LLC bought Yogi Tea in 1972.

U.S. operations 
In 2018, the brand moved its American manufacturing operations from Springfield, Oregon, to a new LEED-certified facility in Eugene, Oregon. The brand also has a satellite sales and marketing office in Portland, Oregon. Yogi Tea is a sponsor of NPR programs.

European operations 
In Europe, the company manufactures in Imola, Italy, and has offices in Hamburg, Germany.  In Europe, the company name is YOGI TEA GmbH.

References

External links
Official EU Website
Official US Website

Tea brands in the United States
Privately held companies based in Oregon
1984 establishments in Oregon
Springfield, Oregon
Ayurveda in the United States
Imola
Companies based in Hamburg
Benefit corporations
Certified B Corporations in the Food & Beverage Industry